Surgut (Khanty: Сәрханӆ, Sərhanł) is a city in Khanty-Mansi Autonomous Okrug, Russia, located on the Ob River near its junction with the Irtysh River. It is one of the few cities in Russia to be larger than the capital or the administrative center of its federal subject in terms of population, economic activity, and tourist traffic. Population:

History
The name of the city, according to one tradition, originates from the Khanty words sur 'fish' and gut 'hole, pit'. It was founded in 1594 by order of Tsar Feodor I.

Surgut at the end of the 16th century was a small fortress with two gates and five towers, one of which had a carriageway. In 1596 the Gostiny Dvor was built. In the 17th and 18th centuries it was a center of the Russian development of Siberia. The fortification, built of strong wood, was located on the cape, so that it was impossible to approach it unnoticed either from the river or from the land. In the central square of the ancient settlement there was a cult shrine. Along the perimeter, the fortress was surrounded by a moat, which was blocked by the structures of the defensive system. Outside the village there were special buildings - handicraft workshops, in particular, a smithy. By the name list of 1625 there were 222 servicemen living here. Subsequently, due to high mortality, the population of Surgut gradually decreased. In 1627 it was home to 216 people, which shrank to 200 in 1635, and 199 in 1642. In the second half of the 17th century the population fluctuated around 200 people, and by the end of the century there were 185 inhabitants in Surgut.

Since 1782, the county town of the Surgut district of the Tobolsk province had been formed. In 1785, the city's coat of arms was approved. At the end of the 18th century, in connection with the development of southern Siberian cities, it lost its administrative significance. Since 1868 - district, and since 1898 - the county town of Tobolsk province. The inhabitants of Surgut, like other Siberians, were on state security. Servants annually received money (5 rubles and 25 kopecks), bread (8 quarters for bachelors and 11 quarters for married couples) and salt (a pound and a quarter for bachelors and a pound and a half for married couples). The inhabitants were supplied with weapons and ammunition. At the end of the 19th century (according to the census of 1897), the population of Surgut was 1100 people. The main occupations of the inhabitants were fishing, gathering of wild plants, trade, cattle breeding, and firewood harvesting. In 1835 the Cossack school was founded, and in 1877 - the men's folk school. The women's parochial school also began operation, along with a weather station in 1878, the library-reading room, the people's house, and since 1913, the telegraph. Since November 3, 1923, the city has been the administrative center of the Tobolsk district of the Ural region. Since April 5, 1926, due to the small population of 1300, Surgut was transformed into a district village. In 1928, on the basis of the fish section, the first industrial enterprise was created - the fish canning factory. In 1929 a collective farm was organized, in 1930 - a forest site, and in 1931 - a timber enterprise. In the 1930s in Surgut, attempts were made to extract minerals. October 23, 1934 was the publication date of Surgut's first newspaper - the "Organizer" (today, the "Surgut Tribune").

Rapid urbanization of Surgut took place in the 1960s, when it became a center of oil and gas production. On June 25, 1965 the work settlement of Surgut was granted town status. The city's holiday is celebrated annually on June 12. The current mayor is Andrey Filatov (since 2021). Ex-mayor Alexander Sidorov oversaw the construction of the Surgut Bridge, the longest one-tower cable-stayed bridge in the world.

Administrative and municipal status
Within the framework of administrative divisions, it serves as the administrative center of Surgutsky District, even though it is not a part of it. As an administrative division, it is incorporated separately as the city of okrug significance of Surgut—an administrative unit with the status equal to that of the districts. As a municipal division, the city of okrug significance of Surgut is incorporated as Surgut Urban Okrug.

Economy

The city is home to the largest port on the Ob River, the largest road/railway junction in northwest Siberia, and two of the world's most powerful power plants, the SDPP-1 (State District Power Plant 1) and SDPP-2 (State District Power Plant 2), which produce over 7,200 megawatts and supply most of the region with relatively cheap electricity.

Surgut's economy is tied to oil production (the city is known as "The Oil Capital of Russia") and natural gas processing. The most important enterprises are the oil firm Surgutneftegaz and Surgutgazprom (a unit of Gazprom). The Surgut-2 Power Station, providing energy for the city, is the second-largest gas-fired power station in the world.

In Surgut, Tyumen Energy Retail Company, the region's largest energy sales company, is Tyumen's guaranteeing supplier of electric power. It ranks first in terms of the value of the productive supply of electricity among the energy distribution companies of the Urals Federal District, and second among the energy sales companies in Russia.

The management office of OJSC TESS, the largest enterprise of the Urals Federal District, is located in the city. It operates in the sphere of complex service maintenance, overhaul, and reconstruction of electric power facilities.

In addition, Surgut is home to many factories: gas processing, condensate stabilization, and motor fuel production. The dairy, meat processing, timber, and building materials industries (mainly for the production of reinforced concrete structures) are also important.

In 2013, the volume of shipped goods, work performed, and services by large and medium-sized producers of industrial products amounted to 100.7 billion rubles.[47]

The structure of industrial production by types of economic activity in 2013:

"Production and distribution of electricity, gas and water" - 87.8%;
"Extraction of minerals" - 6.7%;
"Processing industries" - 5.5%.
The average monthly salary (for large and medium-sized organizations) in 2013 amounted to 68.7 thousand rubles.

Surgut ranks third out of the 250 largest industrial centers of Russia.

Transportation
The city is served by the Surgut International Airport, which offers flights to Moscow, St. Petersburg, Dubai, Irkutsk, and a number of other cities.

Through Surgut run trains to the east (in Novy Urengoy, Nizhnevartovsk), and to the south-west (in Tyumen, Moscow, Novosibirsk, Ufa, Chelyabinsk, Yekaterinburg).

Road P-404 connects Surgut with Tyumen.

There is a port on the Ob River.

Education
As of July 1, 2016, there are 54 preschools, 5 private kindergartens, 33 schools, 3 gymnasiums and 4 lyceums in Surgut.

The system of additional education includes 4 music schools, a children's choreography school, an art school, 2 art studios, 10 foreign 
language schools (one of the schools is an English-style Big Ben), 8 children's and youth sports schools, and others.

Culture

Sights
A commemorative obelisk to the citizens of Surgut, who went to the front in 1941-1945, originally erected at the river station in 1945 in wooden execution. It was restored on May 8, 1995. 
The monument to the first members of the Komsomol of Surgut. On the monument are carved the names of the first 16 Komsomol members of Surgut, and also inscribed are the words of dedication from the youth of the 1960s. The monument plays a big role in patriotic education.
The monument to Pushkin.
The monument to Karl Marx.
Monument to G. Dimitrov
Monument to the soldiers-internationalists.
Monument to the builder "Iron Man".
Monument to a nurse - made at the Sverdlovsk Foundry. 
The monument to the pilots of Siberia - Mi-6 UTair is located not far from the airport.
The monument of gas fire.
Sculpture of a fox.
Monument to Doctor Aybolit.
Lenin monument. 
Historical and cultural center "Old Surgut".
Memorial of Glory (Eternal Fire).
The English language school, which repeats the architecture of Elizabeth Tower that houses the famous bell, Big Ben, is located near the city center.
The Surgut bridge across the Ob River is the world's largest cable-stayed bridge, in which the central span is supported by one pylon.
Park "Behind Saima" is a quiet romantic place among the noisy streets.
Monument to Cyril and Methodius on the area of Sur State University.
Monument to Taras Shevchenko.
Monument Smile.
Monument to condensed milk.
20 km to the west of the city, on the north bank of the Ob River, there is an archaeological monument of Barsov Gora.

Climate

Surgut has a continental subarctic climate (Köppen climate classification Dfc), with long, frigid winters and short, warm summers. Precipitation is moderate, and is higher from May to October, during which rain is more frequent than in the rest of the year, when snow is more frequent. The annual snow cover gets thicker than further east in Siberia due to lesser influence of the Siberian High, and some moisture from the humid European winters reaching across the Ural Mountains. Surgut is the largest city in the world with a subarctic climate.

Sports

Sport and recreation complexes "Friendship", "Fakel", and "Neftyanik" are known far beyond the city limits, as they hold high-level sports competitions. In 2006, they added the multi-functional sports complex "Sparta", beginning construction of its stadium.

In 2009, the city of Surgut ranked 2nd in terms of the socioeconomic development of the municipalities of the Khanty-Mansiysk Autonomous Okrug - Ugra in the field of "Physical Culture and Sport", and ranked 3rd in terms of the effectiveness of the use of sports facilities among the municipalities of the district.

Sport Club:
Universitet Surgut, a basketball team playing in the Russian Basketball Super League
Gazprom-Yugra, a men's volleyball club competing in the Russian Volleyball Super League and playing its home matches at the Premier Arena

Coat of arms

The modern coat of arms of Surgut, featuring "in the golden field - a black fox with a silver tail end, walking along the azure land", was approved on November 20, 2003 by decision of the city duma on November 4, 2003.

Twin towns – sister cities

Surgut is twinned with:
 Chaoyang, China
 Katerini, Greece
 Zalaegerszeg, Hungary

Notable people
 Igor Bobkov (born 1991), ice hockey goaltender
 Miroslava Duma (born 1985)
 Isolda Dychauk (born 1993), actress
 Anastasiia Gontar (born 2001), paralympic swimmer
 Pavel Ivashko (born 1994), sprinter
 Ksenia Klimenko (born 2003), artistic gymnast
 Andrei Kolegayev (1887–1937), Left Socialist-Revolutionary, Soviet politician 
 Aleksandr Kolomeytsev (born 1989), football player 
 Yelena Terleyeva (born 1985), pop singer

Gallery

See also
List of power stations in Russia

References

Notes

Sources

External links
Official website of Surgut 
 Informational website of Surgut

 
Surgutsky Uyezd
Populated places on the Ob River
Socialist planned cities